Diana Carolina Ospina Pineda (born 3 March 1989) is a Colombian footballer who plays as a midfielder for América de Cali and the Colombia women's national team.

International career
Ospina represented Colombia at the 2011 FIFA Women's World Cup in Germany and 2015 FIFA Women's World Cup in Canada as well as the 2016 Summer Olympics in Brazil.

Football Career and Transfer Statistics 
We are going to show you the list of football clubs and seasons in which Diana Carolina Ospina Garcia has played. It includes the total number of appearance (caps), substitution details, goals, yellow and red cards stats.

Notes

References

External links
 

1989 births
Living people
Footballers from Medellín
Colombian women's footballers
Women's association football midfielders
Colombia women's international footballers
2011 FIFA Women's World Cup players
2015 FIFA Women's World Cup players
Olympic footballers of Colombia
Footballers at the 2016 Summer Olympics
Footballers at the 2015 Pan American Games
Pan American Games gold medalists for Colombia
Pan American Games medalists in football
Footballers at the 2019 Pan American Games
Medalists at the 2019 Pan American Games
Medalists at the 2015 Pan American Games
21st-century Colombian women